Cosas de amigos is a 2022 Peruvian comedy film directed by Giovanni Ciccia and written by Guillermo Amoedo. It stars Rodrigo Sánchez Patiño, Bruno Ascenzo, Óscar López Arias, Gisela Ponce de León, Emilia Drago and Miguel Dávalos. It premiered on July 21, 2022. The film is a remake of the Mexican film Do It Like an Hombre.

Synopsis 
Raúl, Eduardo and Santiago have been friends since childhood and have had a happy and “masculine” life, until Santi confesses that he is gay and decides to separate from his girlfriend, Raúl's sister. Raúl can't stand the idea and tries to convince his friend by all means that his is nothing more than a mistake.

Cast 
The actors participating in this film are:

 Rodrigo Sánchez Patiño as Raúl
 Bruno Ascenzo as Santiago
 Óscar López Arias as Eduardo
 Gisela Ponce de León as Natalia
 Emilia Drago as Luciana
 Miguel Dávalos as José
 Juan Ignacio di Marco as Julián Dolán
 Gianfranco Brero as Psychiatrist
 Renzo Shuller as Miki Johnsons

Reception 
The film had its commercial release on July 21, 2022, but had its official preview on July 15, 16, and 17 of the same year.

References

External links 

 

2022 films
2022 comedy films
2022 LGBT-related films
Peruvian comedy films
Peruvian LGBT-related films
La Soga Producciones films
2020s Peruvian films
2010s Spanish-language films
Films set in Peru
Films shot in Peru
Films about friendship
Remakes of Mexican films